Ajith Thilakasena (born 7 October 1933) is a Sinhala writer who deviated from the conventional use of language, creating his own version suitable for the modern age. His short stories are not only different from other Sinhala writers, in the use of the language, but also unique in style.

Works
Sathuro (1960)
Wanadanawa
Adata Obina Basa
Para Dige film script. directed by Dharmasena Pathiraja (1985)
Mada Viramaya
Mal Veni Gal (1978) Poems
Rali Suli (1991)
Saadaya (1992)
Subarathriyak Ahawarai (1984)
Sunnadooli (1970)
Aumuma Saha Peedawa
Rathriye Purwa Bhagaya (1976)
Pituwahal Kara Sitiddee (1964)
Sanskrutika Kaanthaarayak Kara... (1987)
Arunalla Watenakota Withara (2004)

References

1933 births
Living people
Sinhalese writers